The 2017 European Talent Cup was the first season of the European Talent Cup. Participants born between 2000 and 2004 rode a Honda NSF250R.

Calendar
The following races were scheduled to take place in 2017.

Entry list

Championship standings

References

External links
 

2017 in motorcycle sport
2017 in Spanish motorsport